Chacon is an unincorporated community located in Mora County, New Mexico, United States. Chacon has a post office with ZIP code 87713, which opened on September 10, 1894. It was named after its first postmaster, Diego Chacon. Harsh winters give the area the nickname "Little Alaska."

References

External links
Chacon post office history

Unincorporated communities in Mora County, New Mexico
Unincorporated communities in New Mexico